Jenny Naomi Kleeman is a British journalist, author and broadcaster.  She has reported for Channel 4's foreign affairs series Unreported World and BBC One's Panorama, and was a launch presenter on Times Radio. She regularly writes for The Guardian and The Sunday Times Magazine.

Education
Kleeman was educated at Westminster School, a boarding and day independent school in Central London, followed by Queens' College, Cambridge, where she was awarded a double-first Bachelor of Arts in Social and Political Sciences, on 29 June 2001.

Life and career
Kleeman began working at The Guardian newspaper after a few weeks' work experience. She has reported for HBO's Vice News Tonight, Channel 4's Dispatches, The One Show on BBC One among others, as well as making 13 films for Unreported World. She was nominated for the Amnesty International Gaby Rado memorial award for her work on Unreported World.

She has said that she admires the documentaries of Nick Broomfield, Jon Ronson, Charlie Brooker and Paul Foot.

Since June 2015, Kleeman has contributed short documentaries to The Guardian'''s video output. Her projects so far have included work on revenge porn, indigenous communities, sex robots, and British children born with HIV/AIDS.

Kleeman is a regular on Sky News' Press Preview. She co-presented the Friday to Sunday breakfast show on Times Radio which launched in June 2020, alongside Luke Jones. They left in May 2022, and were replaced by Chloe Tilley and Calum Macdonald.

Works
In 2020, Kleeman's first book, Sex Robots & Vegan Meat: Adventures at the frontier of Birth, Food, Sex, and Death'', was published.

References

External links
Official Website
Guardian Page

Alumni of Queens' College, Cambridge
British documentary filmmakers
British investigative journalists
Living people
People educated at Westminster School, London
Year of birth missing (living people)